Pejman Hadadi (born 1969, in Tehran) is an internationally acclaimed Iranian tonbak player and Persian classical musician. In 1990 Hadadi emigrated to the United States.

In 1995, he joined Dastan Ensemble.

Awards
Durfee Foundation Master Musician Award (2001)

Recordings
"Whisper" with Ali Akbar Moradi, tanbur (Kereshmeh Records, 2001)
"Midnight Sun" with Hossein Behroozi-Nia, barbat (7/8 Productions, 2000)
"Fire of Passion" with Ali Akbar Moradi, tanbur (7/8 Productions, 1999)
"A Tale of Love"  with Parisa & Hossein Omoumi, ney (Kereshmeh Records, 1999)
"Through Eternity"  with Dastan Ensemble (Traditional Crossroads, 1997)
"Beyond Denial" with Axiom of Choice (X Dot 25, 1994)
"Scattering Stars Like Dust" with Kayhan Kalhor. (Traditional Crossroad 4288)
"in sare sodaei" with Pouya Saraei

Notes

1969 births
Living people
Iranian tonbak players
People from Tehran